Philip Bolton (born April 5, 1983) is an American rugby union and Rugby Seven's player.

Early life and education

Phil Bolton began his rugby career at Jesuit College Preparatory School of Dallas. After a year playing in Europe, Bolton accepted a rugby scholarship to University of New Mexico in Albuquerque, New Mexico. Bolton was selected as an All American in 2006, 2007.

Professional career

Bolton began his professional career when he joined Clive Rugby Football Club in Hawke's Bay, New Zealand. In 2008 he was part of a Clive team that won the Nash Cup in Napier, New Zealand.

References

1983 births
Living people
American rugby union players
University of New Mexico alumni
Jesuit College Preparatory School of Dallas alumni